Orlando Antonio Vásquez Mendoza (born March 13, 1969) is a retired male weightlifter from Nicaragua. He competed in two Summer Olympics for his native Central American country during his career, and twice (1991 and 1995) claimed a bronze medal at the Pan American Games in the men's flyweight division.

References
sports-reference

1969 births
Living people
Nicaraguan male weightlifters
Weightlifters at the 1992 Summer Olympics
Weightlifters at the 2000 Summer Olympics
Olympic weightlifters of Nicaragua
Weightlifters at the 1991 Pan American Games
Weightlifters at the 1995 Pan American Games
Pan American Games bronze medalists for Nicaragua
Pan American Games medalists in weightlifting
Medalists at the 1991 Pan American Games
Medalists at the 1995 Pan American Games